Baile Liam or Baile Uilliam is the Irish for "William's town" and may refer to several places in Ireland:

 Ballywilliam, County Wexford, a village
 Williamstown, County Galway, a village
 Williamstown, County Limerick, a townland